Aanya, Anya or Anja is a given name. The names are feminine in most cultures especially Indian, and unisex in several African and European countries.

Origins and variant forms
 Aanya or Anya is an Indian name that means inexhaustible, limitless and resurrection. It is of Sanskrit origin.
 Aanya or Anya in Hebrew means favoured by God.
Anya (Аня) is a Russian diminutive of Anna.
Ania is the spelling in Polish, which is also a diminutive of Anna.
The spelling Anja is common in Croatian, Norwegian, Danish, German, Swedish, Finnish, Dutch, Afrikaans, Slovenian, Macedonian, Montenegrin, Bosnian, Serbian and  Kurdish.
Anya is sometimes used as an anglicisation of the Irish name Áine
Anya is an old Kurdish name. It means "strength" or "power".
Anya is a Hungarian word for "mother".
Anya is a Nigerian Igbo name, and also word for "eye."
Anya (ⴰⵏⵢⴰ) is an Amazigh/Berber name. It means "rhythm" or "melody" in Berber languages.

People with the given name Anya 
Anya Ayoung-Chee (born 1981), former Miss Trinidad and Tobago and winner of season 9 of Project Runway 
Anya Chalotra, British actress
Anya Corke (born 1990), grandmaster and the top female chess player in Hong Kong
Anya Gallaccio (born 1963), British artist
Anya Garnis (born 1982), Siberian Ballroom and Latin dancer
Anya Hindmarch (born 1968), British fashion designer
Anya Kamenetz (born 1980), American writer and journalist
Anya Lahiri (born 1982), English singer
Anya Major (born 1966), British athlete, actress, model and singer
Anya Marina (born 1976), American singer-songwriter
Anya Monzikova (born 1984), Russian-American model and actress 
Anya Schiffrin (born 1962), American journalist and writer, international business professor at Columbia University
Anya Seton (1904–1990), American author of historical romances
Anya Singh (born 1992), Indian actress
Anya Shrubsole (born 1991), English cricketer
Anya Taranda (1915–1970), American model
Anya Taylor-Joy (born 1996), American-born Argentinian-British actress
Anya Teixeira (1913–1992), Ukrainian-born British street photographer

People with the given name Anja
Anja Andersen (born 1969), Danish handball player
Anja Barugh (born 1999), New Zealand freestyle skier
Anja Blacha (born 1990), German mountaineer
Anja Daems (born 1968), Belgian television and radio presenter
Anja Garbarek (born 1970), Norwegian musician
Anja Hammerseng-Edin (born 1983), Norwegian handball player
Anja Hazekamp (born 1968), Dutch politician
Anja Pärson (born 1981), Swedish alpine skier
Anja Plaschg (born 1990),  alias Soap&Skin, Austrian musician
Anja Ringgren Lovén (born 1978), Danish charity worker 
Anja Rubik (born 1983), Polish fashion model
Anja Spasojević (born 1983), Serbian professional volleyball player

People with the given name Ania
Ania (singer) (born 1981), Polish singer and composer
Ania Marson, Polish actress
Ania Said Chaurembo, Tanzanian politician
Ania Walwicz (1951–2020), Australian poet and prose writer
Ania Wiśniewska (born 1977), Polish singer

Fictional characters
Anya, daughter of the Marvel Comics character Magneto
Anya, or Princess Ann, a character in the film Roman Holiday
Anya, or Princess Anastasia, protagonist of the 1997 film Anastasia
Anya, in the video game Diablo II: Lord of Destruction
Anya, in the video game Project I.G.I.
Anya, in the television series Star Trek: The Next Generation
Anya, in the manga series Negima!
Anya, in the television series The 100
Anya Alstreim, in the anime series Code Geass
Anya Amasova, in the film The Spy Who Loved Me
Anya Borzakovskaya, in the graphic novel Anya's Ghost
Anya Claus, in the film Santa Claus: The Movie
Anya Corazon, in Marvel Comics
Anya Forger, in the manga and anime series Spy × Family
Anya Hepburn, in the manga series Soul Eater Not!
Anya Jenkins, in the television series Buffy the Vampire Slayer
Anya MacPherson, in the television series Degrassi: The Next Generation
Anya Oliwa, in the video game Wolfenstein: The New Order
Anya Stroud, in the video game series Gears of War
Ania Williams, in the soap opera Family Affairs

People with the surname Anya
Ikechi Anya (born 1988), Scottish footballer

See also
Áine (given name), an Irish given name with the same pronunciation
Anya (disambiguation), other meanings
Ania (disambiguation)

References

Slavic feminine given names
Serbian feminine given names